Lacurile may refer to several villages in Romania:

 Lacurile, a village in Ciofrângeni Commune, Argeș County
 Lacurile, a village in Bisoca Commune, Buzău County